Dummy is a 2002 American romantic comedy-drama film written and directed by Greg Pritikin. The film stars Adrien Brody as an ex-office worker who becomes a ventriloquist. It also stars Milla Jovovich, Illeana Douglas, Vera Farmiga, Jessica Walter, Ron Leibman, and Jared Harris. It premiered at the American Film Market on February 21, 2002, and received a limited theatrical release on September 12, 2003.

Plot
Steven Schoichet is a recently unemployed ne'er-do-well who has difficulty expressing himself. Steven finds he has a knack for ventriloquism. Steven's best friend is Fangora "Fanny" Gurkel, an aspiring punk rock singer who, along with Steven, is just looking for her niche. Eventually, Fanny takes a shine to klezmer music when she learns of an opportunity to get an actual gig. Through his newfound talent, Steven discovers that he is able to overcome his social problems through his dummy and decides to try impressing and winning the heart of Lorena Fanchetti.

Cast
 Adrien Brody as Steven Schoichet
 Milla Jovovich as Fangora "Fanny" Gurkel
 Illeana Douglas as Heidi Schoichet
 Vera Farmiga as Lorena Fanchetti
 Jessica Walter as Fern Schoichet
 Ron Leibman as Lou Schoichet
 Jared Harris as Michael Foulicker
 Mirabella Pisani as Bonnie
 Helen Hanft as Mrs. Gurkel
 Richmond Hoxie as Sorensen
 Adam LeFevre as Theatre Director
 Poppi Kramer as Jen Freed
 Alan Demovsky as Talking Mime
 Lou Martini Jr. as Unemployed Italian
 Gabor Morea as Unemployed Frottager
 Edward Hibbert as Unemployed Actor
 Robert Larkin as Pharmacist
 Alan Semok as Professor Parlepancia
 John Elsen as Cop
 Debbie Ross as Le Bagel Waitress
 Lawrence Leritz as Groom (uncredited)
 Natalia Paruz as musical saw player

Production

Casting
In May 2000, it was reported by Variety that Adrien Brody and Milla Jovovich had been cast in the film, Brody as the lead character of Steven, and Jovovich as the best friend of Brody's character. The following month, in June 2000, it was announced that Illeana Douglas had joined the cast in a supporting role. Vera Farmiga, Ron Leibman, Jared Harris and Jessica Walter were also cast in supporting roles. Brody (who had no previous experience as a ventriloquist) performed all of the ventriloquism and puppetry live during shooting, doing so without puppeteering stand-ins or voiceover dubbing. He was coached prior to and during production by veteran actor-ventriloquist-puppetmaker Alan Semok, who is credited in the film as special consultant and designer/creator of the title character.

Filming
Principal photography took place in New York City, Wayne, New Jersey, and Long Island, New York in July and August 2000.

Reception

Box office
The film was given a limited release in the United States. Dummy made $30,130 from 5 theaters in its opening weekend. It made an additional $41,516 at the box office for a total domestic gross of $71,646.

Critical reception
Dummy received mostly positive reviews from film critics. On Rotten Tomatoes, the film has an approval rating of 71%, based on 34 reviews, with an average rating of 6.15/10. The site's consensus reads, "Dummy is a sweet family comedy that succeeds due to charming performances, even if the final product feels slightly undercooked." On Metacritic, the film holds a 48% rating based on 12 critical reviews, indicating "mixed or average reviews".

References

External links

 
 

2002 films
2002 independent films
2002 black comedy films
2002 romantic comedy-drama films
2000s English-language films
American independent films
American black comedy films
American romantic comedy-drama films
Artisan Entertainment films
Films about couples
Films about families
Puppet films
Films shot in New Jersey
Films shot in New York (state)
Unemployment in fiction
Ventriloquism
2000s American films